Malmsjö is a Swedish surname. Notable people with the surname include:

Jan Malmsjö (born 1932), Swedish actor, musical star, and singer
Jonas Malmsjö (born 1971), Swedish actor, son of Jan

See also
Malmsjön

Surnames of Swedish origin